Puče is a village in the City Municipality of Koper in the Littoral region of Slovenia near the border with Croatia.

A small church in the settlement is dedicated to Our Lady of Mount Carmel and belongs to the Parish of Koštabona.

References

External links

Puče on Geopedia

Populated places in the City Municipality of Koper